Juha is a masculine given name of Finnish origin derived from Johannes (or John in English language contexts). Notable people with the name include:

 Juha Alén
 Juha Gustafsson
 Juha Hakola
 Juha Harju
 Juha Haukkala
 Juha Hautamäki
 Juha Helppi
 Juha Hernesniemi
 Juha Hirvi
 Juha Hurme
 Juha Ikonen
 Juha Isolehto
 Juha Janhunen
 Juha Jokela
 Juha Järvenpää
 Juha Kankkunen
 Juha Kaunismäki
 Juha Kilpiä
 Juha Kivi
 Juha Kylmänen
 Juha Lallukka
 Juha Laukkanen
 Juha Leimu
 Juha Leiviskä
 Juha Leskinen
 Juha Lind
 Juha Malinen
 Juha Mannerkorpi
 Juha Metsola
 Juha Metsäperä
 Juha Mieto
 Juha Pasoja
 Juha Pekka Alanen
 Juha Peltola
 Juha Pentikäinen
 Juha Pirinen
 Juha Pitkämäki
 Juha Plosila
 Juha Rantasila
 Juha Rehula
 Juha Reini
 Juha Riihijärvi
 Juha Riippa
 Juha Ruusuvuori
 Juha Salminen
 Juha Salo
 Juha Sihvola
 Juha Sipilä
 Juha Soukiala
 Juha Suoranta
 Juha Tapio
 Juha K. Tapio
 Juha Tiainen
 Juha Toivonen
 Juha Tuomi
 Juha Turunen
 Juha Uotila
 Juha Väätäinen
 Juha Vainio
 Juha Valjakkala
 Juha Valkama
 Juha Varto
 Juha Widing
 Juha Ylönen

See also
 Juha-Matti Räsänen
 Juha-Matti Ruuskanen
 Juhamatti Aaltonen
 Juha-Pekka Haataja
 Juha-Pekka Hytönen
 Juha-Pekka Inkeröinen
 Juha-Pekka "JP" Leppäluoto
 Juha-Pekka Pietilä
 Juha-Petteri Purolinna

Finnish masculine given names